The AEW TNT Championship is a men's professional wrestling television championship created and promoted by the American promotion All Elite Wrestling (AEW). Established on March 30, 2020, it is named after the TNT television network, which currently airs AEW's secondary core program, Rampage, as well as the promotion's Battle of the Belts quarterly television specials. The inaugural champion was Cody Rhodes. The current champion is Powerhouse Hobbs, who is in his first reign.

History

In September 2019, a month before All Elite Wrestling (AEW) launched their first weekly television program, Dynamite, then-AEW Executive Vice President and wrestler Cody teased that the promotion would eventually debut a television championship, but their focus at that time was on their other recently established titles. In February 2020, wrestling journalist Dave Meltzer directly asked Cody on the possibility of the promotion adding a secondary championship. Although he did not confirm or deny it, Cody did not rule out the possibility of a secondary or "mid-card" title debuting that year. The following month on March 30 on AEW's YouTube series Road to Dynamite, a secondary championship was officially announced. AEW play-by-play commentator and senior producer Tony Schiavone revealed that there would be an eight-man, single-elimination tournament to crown the first-ever AEW TNT Champion. The tournament began on the April 8 episode of Dynamite with the final scheduled for Double or Nothing on May 23. On the April 29 episode, Cody and Lance Archer won their respective semifinals matches, setting up the inaugural championship match. 

At Double or Nothing, Cody defeated Archer to become the inaugural champion. Former professional boxer Mike Tyson presented the championship to Cody. His first reign with the title included an 'open challenge' where he would defend the title on a near weekly televised basis, even to independent wrestlers outside the promotion. These performances notably led to the signings of Ricky Starks and Eddie Kingston. In November during Cody's second reign as TNT Champion, his ring name was lengthened to Cody Rhodes following a legal battle with WWE over the trademark for the name.

During the Brodie Lee Celebration of Life, which was the December 30, 2020, episode of Dynamite, AEW announced that they had retired the red strap version of the title belt that had been used up to that point to honor Huber, whose ring name was Mr. Brodie Lee, the second TNT Champion. Lee unexpectedly died on December 26 and his final match was on the October 7 episode of Dynamite where he unsuccessfully defended the TNT Championship against Cody Rhodes in a Dog Collar match. The retired TNT Championship belt was given to Huber's son, Brodie Lee Jr. (real name Brodie Huber), who was honored as being "TNT Champion for life" by AEW President and Chief Executive Officer Tony Khan. AEW commentator Tony Schiavone clarified that only the belt design was retired, not the championship itself; a new black strap version of the belt was debuted by champion Darby Allin during Night 1 of the special New Year's Smash episode of Dynamite on January 6, 2021.

During the special Holiday Bash episode of Rampage on December 25, 2021, Cody Rhodes defeated Sammy Guevara to become a record three-time TNT Champion. The two were scheduled to have a rematch for the championship at Battle of the Belts I on January 8, 2022; however, Cody was pulled from the event as he had been in contact with family who had tested positive for COVID-19, thus requiring him to quarantine. Guevara instead faced Cody's brother Dustin Rhodes to determine an interim champion. Guevara defeated Dustin and served as the interim champion until the January 26 episode of Dynamite. That episode, which was a special episode titled Beach Break, Guevara faced and defeated Cody in a ladder match to determine the undisputed TNT Champion.

On March 5, 2023, at Revolution, Wardlow defeated Samoa Joe for the championship. Three days later, and initially not as part of a storyline, Wardlow's rental car was broken into; both his gear and the championship belt were stolen as a result.

Name
The championship is named after the TNT television network, which originally aired both of AEW's primary programs, Dynamite and Rampage, the latter of which premiered in August 2021. TNT's parent company WarnerMedia requested AEW to create the title and have it named as the TNT Championship. In the press release about the title, Tony Khan stated "it's only fitting that the champion and the title belt will carry the logo of the globally-respected TNT brand, and that they'll represent not only AEW but also the great quality programming, massive reach, and storied history in the wrestling business that are all associated with TNT." 

In January 2022, Dynamite moved to TNT's sister channel TBS, which is also owned by WarnerMedia, while Rampage remained on TNT. In addition to Rampage remaining on the channel, AEW agreed to produce quarterly television specials on TNT (Battle of the Belts), with the championship defended on these specials. While it had been speculated that the title would be renamed to the TBS Championship, Cody Rhodes confirmed that it would not be renamed, and instead, a separate AEW TBS Championship was established for the women's division.

Although viewed as a secondary title to the AEW World Championship by fans and media of the professional wrestling industry, Tony Khan stated that he takes exception to calling it a secondary or mid-card title. He said that he does not book the championship as a mid-card title, saying that "I'm looking at it as a top championship that stars hold".

Inaugural tournament
The first half of the TNT Championship Tournament bracket was announced on the March 31, 2020 episode of Dark, with the second half revealed on the following night's Dynamite. The tournament began on the April 8 episode of Dynamite and concluded at Double or Nothing on May 23.

Belt designs

The TNT Championship belt has six plates, which were originally on a red leather strap. The center plate prominently features the TNT network logo at the center. Above the TNT logo is AEW's logo, while below the TNT logo is a red banner that says "CHAMPION". The two inner side plates feature "Tara on Techwood", 1050 Techwood Drive in Atlanta, the building that was the original home of TNT. The two outer side plates feature AEW's logo, while a third smaller side plate on the far right side also features the promotion's logo. When the belt was initially unveiled at Double or Nothing on May 23, it was on a red leather strap but had no plating as production of the belt had been delayed due to the COVID-19 pandemic; it was also revealed that the final version would have gold plating and be unveiled at a later date. The belt was produced by Ron Edwardsen of Red Leather, who also made the AEW World Tag Team Championship belts. He further said that there would also be nickel plating in addition to gold on the final version of the TNT Championship as well as a relief TNT logo. The completed version of the belt was shown on AEW's Twitter just a few hours before the August 12 episode of Dynamite where the finished design was debuted for Cody's match against Scorpio Sky, where Cody retained.

Following the unexpected death of Mr. Brodie Lee, the championship's second title holder, in December 2020, AEW retired the red strap version of the championship belt that had been used up to that point to honor Lee (similar to how sports teams retire a number). During night one of the special New Year's Smash episode of Dynamite on January 6, 2021, a new belt was unveiled by Darby Allin, featuring the same design as the previous belt but on a black leather strap as opposed to red. 

After Sammy Guevara defeated Miro to win the title on the September 29, 2021, episode of Dynamite, Guevara was presented with an updated design of the standard championship belt to replace Miro's custom belt. This new belt returned to the design of the standard black strap version introduced by Darby Allin, but with rhinestones added in the circular area behind the relief TNT logo. The TNT Championship's original designer, Ron Edwardsen, also designed the updated belt, which has a total of 1,577 rhinestones, which Edwardsen himself nicknamed the "TNT Bling" belt.

Custom designs
During night one of Fyter Fest on July 14, 2021, reigning champion Miro introduced his own custom version of the championship belt in the colors of the Bulgarian flag, as well as his persona change as "The Redeemer." The plates were on a white leather strap and the center plate was the same; however, the red banner was changed to green. Additionally, the two inner side plates were changed to feature the Coat of Arms of his hometown of Plovdiv, Bulgaria. The text below the arms said "Древен и Вечен" (Bulgarian: Dreven i Vechen), which means "Ancient and Eternal". Miro's custom belt was made by Belts By Dan.

On the May 20, 2022, episode of Rampage, Sammy Guevara, Tay Conti, and Frankie Kazarian destroyed the standard belt that they stole from reigning champion Scorpio Sky. The following week on the May 27 episode, Dan Lambert and Ethan Page presented Sky with a custom version of the championship belt in the colors of Sky's hometown and favorite National Basketball Association team, the Los Angeles Lakers. The "Laker belt" had a gold strap, and the word "Champion" on a purple banner. Emblazoned on the end of the strap between the snap buttons was "8-24", referring to the numbers worn by late Lakers star Kobe Bryant. The title's original designer, Ron Edwardsen, also designed the "Laker belt".

Reigns

As of 
Cody Rhodes, then known simply as Cody, was the inaugural champion. He is also tied with Sammy Guevara for the most reigns at three. Darby Allin's first reign is the longest at 186 days and he also has the longest combined reign at 214 days, while Wardlow's second reign is the shortest at three days. Allin is also the youngest champion at the age of 27, while Samoa Joe was the oldest, winning the title at 43.

Powerhouse Hobbs is the current champion in his first reign. He defeated Wardlow by technical knockout in a Falls Count Anywhere match on the March 8, 2023, episode of Dynamite in Sacramento, California.

Notes

References

External links
 Official AEW TNT Championship Title History
 

 
All Elite Wrestling championships
Television wrestling championships
TNT (American TV network)